Mahnoor Baloch (born 15 February 1970) is an American-born Canadian Pakistani actress, film director and former model. Baloch made her television debut in 1993 with the drama serial Marvi aired on PTV. She is often praised by critics for her fitness and younger looks on-screen.

Career 
Baloch appeared in the TV commercials of well known brand names. In 1993, she made her acting debut in the TV serial (PTV Drama) Marvi which was directed by Sultana Siddiqui.  Her next series was Dusra Aasmaan. In this serial she performed the role of Abid Ali's daughter.

In 2000, Mahnoor Baloch started directing and producing her own drama serials. Her first serial as director was Lamhay. Later she directed another television series Patjhar Ki Chaioon.

In 2012, she was given Lux Style Award for Best Actress on her role in Talafi aired by PTV. She appeared in Geo TV's Eid special play Come On Hum Dum (2013) as the wife of co-star Mohib Mirza. She later appeared as the female lead in Pakistani film Main Hoon Shahid Afridi (2013). For the role, she has filmed an item song Teri Hi Kami alongside Mathira and Humayun Saeed, directed by Saqib Malik and produced and penned by Shani and Kami.

In 2013, Baloch made her Hollywood debut in Torn playing the role of Maryam, a mother whose teenage son is killed in an explosion at a suburban mall.

Filmography

Films

Television

Personal life 
Baloch was married to Hameed Siddiqui at the age of 15. She has one daughter Laila Hameed, who got married in 2015. She became grandmother in 2016.

Awards and nominations

References

External links 
 

Living people
Canadian people of Baloch descent
Pakistani female models
Pakistani television actresses
American models of Pakistani descent
Pakistani television directors
Actresses from Karachi
20th-century Pakistani actresses
21st-century Pakistani actresses
Pakistani film actresses
Actresses in Urdu cinema
Naturalized citizens of Canada
1970 births
Women television directors